Monfortinho e Salvaterra do Extremo is a civil parish in the municipality of Idanha-a-Nova, Portugal. It was formed in 2013 by the merger of the former parishes Monfortinho and Salvaterra do Extremo. The population in 2011 was 706, in an area of 135.39 km2.

References

See also
Termas de Monfortinho

Freguesias of Idanha-a-Nova